Newnans Lake (or Newnan's Lake) is a lake located off State Road 20, east of Gainesville, Florida.

The lake was originally known as Lake Pithlachocco. It was renamed after Daniel Newnan, who led a detachment of Georgia militia that fought an inconclusive battle with Seminoles near the lake in 1812.

Surface flow into the lake is primarily from the north, via Hatchett Creek, Little Hatchett Creek, and other streams. The primary outlet is Prairie Creek on the south side of the lake. A spillway as installed in 1967 to control the water level of the lake. It is classified as eutrophic. Before the spillway was installed, the water level of the lake fluctuated seasonally. The margins of the lake are dominated by Cypress swamp forests. Forty-four archaeological sites have been identified on the shores of the lake, or at nearby ponds and marshes. The lake has been designated a Fish Management Area by the Florida Fish and Wildlife Conservation Commission and the Alachua County Board of County Commissioners.

Prairie Creek, the principal outlet of Newnans Lake, originally drained into Paynes Prairie. The Camp family, which owned Paynes Prairie and operated a cattle ranch on it, wanted to drain the prairie to improve it as pasture. After very heavy rain flooded the Prairie in 1927, the Camps commenced projects  to lower the water table on the Prairie that included diverting Prairie Creek to the River Styx, which flows into Orange Lake.

In the Spring and Summer of 2000, a drought revealed canoe remnants. Fifty-five of the canoes were analyzed through radiocarbon assays, which showed 41 of them to date to between 2300 and 5000 B.C. The wood choice and manufacturing techniques were comparable to other Archaic Period canoes. The discovery led to the site's addition to the National Register of Historic Places in March 2001.

The  Newnans Lake State Forest is located to the west of the lake. The Newnans Lake Conservation Area owned by the St. Johns River Water Management District is primarily along the north end of the lake.

See also
Lake Pithlachocco Canoe Site

Citations

References
 

Lakes of Alachua County, Florida
Protected areas of Alachua County, Florida
Tourist attractions in Gainesville, Florida
Lakes of Florida
Protected areas established in 2001